Zakho International Stadium (Arabic: ملعب زاخو الدولي, Kurdish: یاریگەها نێودەولەتیا زاخۆ) is a multi-purpose stadium in Zakho, Iraq. It is used mostly for football matches and serves as the home stadium of Zakho FC which plays in the Iraqi Premier League. The stadium holds 25,000 people. It has 20 entrance and exit gates. The roof consists of 12,000 m2 of polycarbonate architectural panels shaded in red and white depicting the colors of the local team. Construction took 3 years (from 2012 to 2015) for a total cost of $20 million.

The opening ceremony took place on Wednesday 3 June 2015 between Zakho FC and the Iraq national football team. The match ended in a 2–0 victory for the Iraq national football team, scored by captain Younis Mahmoud and Hussein Ali Wahid.

The inauguration aroused large official and popular attendance, including the presence of the former Minister of Youth and Sport Abdul-Hussein Abtaan, the head of the National Olympic Committee of Iraq Raad Hammoudi and the former Iraqi national team player, Hussein Saeed.

Gallery

See also 
List of football stadiums in Iraq

References

Football venues in Iraq
Football venues in Iraqi Kurdistan
2015 establishments in Iraq
Sports venues completed in 2015